Timothy Paul Sweeney (born April 12, 1967) is an American former professional ice hockey player who played in the National Hockey League from 1990 to 1998 with the Calgary Flames, Boston Bruins, Mighty Ducks of Anaheim, and New York Rangers. He was born in Boston, but grew up in Weymouth, Massachusetts. Sweeney played for Boston College from 1985–89, and then made his professional debut in 1989, and aside from playing in the NHL played in the minor leagues. Internationally Sweeney played for the American national team at the 1992 Winter Olympics and 1994 World Championship.

Playing career
He was selected 122nd overall in the 1985 NHL Entry Draft by the Calgary Flames.

After college, Sweeney played for the Salt Lake Golden Eagles of the IHL, and then in the NHL for the Calgary Flames, the Boston Bruins, the Mighty Ducks of Anaheim and the New York Rangers.  Sweeney left his legacy on the NHL by being recognized as the only player to play for only these four clubs during his career.  His last professional season was 1998–99, for the Providence Bruins of the AHL.

In his first year after college, the 1989–90 season, he won the International Hockey League's Ken McKenzie Trophy for Rookie of the Year. Sweeney represented the United States at the 1992 Winter Olympics.

Post retirement
After retiring from hockey, Sweeney worked as a color commentator for Boston College and Hockey East games.

Personal life
Sweeney is married to Chrissy (Roche) Sweeney. Together they have three children, Lily, Emily, and Timothy Sweeney.

Career statistics

Regular season and playoffs

International

Awards and honors

References

External links

1967 births
Living people
American men's ice hockey left wingers
Boston Bruins players
Boston College Eagles men's ice hockey players
Calgary Flames draft picks
Calgary Flames players
Hartford Wolf Pack players
Ice hockey people from Boston
Ice hockey players at the 1992 Winter Olympics
Mighty Ducks of Anaheim players
Minnesota Wild scouts
New York Rangers players
Olympic ice hockey players of the United States
Providence Bruins players
Salt Lake Golden Eagles (IHL) players
Sportspeople from Weymouth, Massachusetts
AHCA Division I men's ice hockey All-Americans